

List of Ambassadors

Shlomit Sufa 2021-
Shani Cooper 2019 - 
Emanuel Mehl 2015 - 2018
Sharon Bar-Li (Non-Resident, Accra) 2011 - 2015
Pinhas Rodan 1969 - 1973
Nahom Astar 1965 - 1969
Ehud Avriel (Non-Resident, Accra) 1957 - 1960
Gavriel Gavrieli 1983 - 1985
Yeroham Cohen 1960 - 1962

References

Liberia
Israel